The Galatheidae are a family of squat lobsters.

Genera 
There are 11 living genera and 7 extinct genera in the family Galatheidae:
† Acanthogalathea Müller & Collins, 1991 – Upper Eocene
 Alainius Baba, 1991
 Allogalathea Baba, 1969
 Allomunida Baba, 1988
 Coralliogalathea Baba & Javed, 1974
 Fennerogalathea Baba, 1988
 Galathea Fabricius, 1793
 Janetogalathea Baba & Wicksten, 1997
 Lauriea Baba, 1971
† Lessinigalathea De Angeli & Garassino, 2002 – Lower Eocene
† Lophoraninella Glaessner, 1945 – Upper Cretaceous
† Luisogalathea Karasawa & Hayakawa, 2000 – Upper Cretaceous
 Macrothea Macpherson & Cleva, 2010
† Mesogalathea Houša, 1963 – Upper Jurassic to Cretaceous
 Nanogalathea Tirmizi & Javed, 1980
 † Palaeomunida Lőrenthey, 1901 – Upper Jurassic to Oligocene
 Phylladiorhynchus Baba, 1969
† Spathagalathea De Angeli & Garassino, 2002 – Upper Eocene
† = Extinct genus

Several genera that were previously part of Galatheidae were revised to be part of different families in 2010.

References 

Squat lobsters
Decapod families
Taxa named by George Samouelle